The 1996–97 NBA season was the Bucks' 29th season in the National Basketball Association. In the 1996 NBA draft, the Bucks selected point guard Stephon Marbury out of Georgia Tech with the fourth overall pick, but soon traded him to the Minnesota Timberwolves in exchange for top draft pick shooting guard Ray Allen from the University of Connecticut. In the off-season, the team signed free agent Armen Gilliam, acquired Andrew Lang from the Timberwolves, and acquired Elliot Perry from the Phoenix Suns. 

Under new head coach Chris Ford, along with the new trio of Allen, Vin Baker and Glenn Robinson, the Bucks appeared to be on their way breaking out of the gate with a 15–11 start. However, they could not maintain that momentum as they slipped under .500, holding a 21–26 record at the All-Star break. At midseason, the team traded second-year guard Shawn Respert to the Toronto Raptors in exchange for Acie Earl. The Bucks lost eight straight games between February and March, missing the playoffs again by finishing seventh in the Central Division with a 33–49 record.

Baker averaged 21.0 points, 10.3 rebounds and 1.4 blocks per game, and was named to the All-NBA Third Team, and selected for the 1997 NBA All-Star Game, while Robinson averaged 21.1 points, 6.3 rebounds and 1.3 steals per game, and Allen provided the team with 13.4 points per game, and was selected to the NBA All-Rookie Second Team. In addition, Sherman Douglas contributed 9.7 points and 5.4 assists per game, while Johnny Newman provided with 8.7 points per game off the bench, Gilliam averaged 8.6 points and 6.2 rebounds per game, Perry contributed 6.9 points, 3.0 assists and 1.2 steals per game off the bench, and Lang averaged 5.3 points and rebounds per game each, but only played 52 games due to an Achilles injury.

Following the season, Baker was traded to the Seattle SuperSonics in an off-season three-team trade, while Newman was dealt to the Denver Nuggets, Douglas, who was involved in a trade with the Cleveland Cavaliers, signed as a free agent with the New Jersey Nets, and Earl was released to free agency.

Draft picks

Roster

Regular season

Season standings

z - clinched division title
y - clinched division title
x - clinched playoff spot

Record vs. opponents

Game log

|-style="background:#bbffbb;"
| 1 || November 1, 1996 || @ Philadelphia
| W 111–103
|Vin Baker (25)
|
|
| CoreStates Center20,444
| 1–0
|-style="background:#bbffbb;"
| 2 || November 2, 1996 || Boston
| W 124–102
|Johnny Newman, Glenn Robinson (21)
|
|
| Bradley Center17,275
| 2–0
|-style="background:#bbffbb;"
| 3 || November 6, 1996 || Vancouver
| W 105–89
|Ray Allen, Vin Baker (20)
|Vin Baker (11)
|Sherman Douglas (8)
| Bradley Center13,689
| 3–0
|- style="background:#fcc;"
| 4 || November 8, 1996 || @ Miami
| L 89—101
|Vin Baker (27)
|
|
| Miami Arena15,200
| 3–1
|- style="background:#bbffbb;"
| 5 || November 9, 1996 || @ Charlotte
| W 100—98
|Vin Baker (28)
|
|
| Charlotte Coliseum24,042
| 4–1
|-style="background:#bbffbb;"
| 6 || November 12, 1996 || Phoenix
| W 99–89
|Vin Baker (32)
|
|
| Bradley Center13,565
| 5–1
|- style="background:#fcc;"
| 7 || November 14, 1996 || @ Golden State
| L 86—95
|Vin Baker (32)
|
|
| San Jose Arena14,414
| 5–2
|- style="background:#fcc;"
| 8 || November 15, 1996 || @ Sacramento
| L 99—103
|Glenn Robinson (29)
|
|
| ARCO Arena17,317
| 5–3
|- style="background:#fcc;"
| 9 || November 17, 1996 || @ L. A. Clippers
| L 94—102
|Glenn Robinson (31)
|Armen Gilliam (13)
|
| Los Angeles Memorial Sports Arena7,311
| 5–4
|-style="background:#bbffbb;"
| 10 || November 19, 1996 || Dallas
| W 100–97
|Armen Gilliam (27)
|
|
| Bradley Center13,225
| 6–4
|-style="background:#fcc;"
| 11 || November 21, 1996 || Atlanta
| L 65–73
|
|
|
| Bradley Center14,698
| 6–5
|-style="background:#fcc;"
| 12 || November 23, 1996 || Washington
| L 90–95
|
|
|
| Bradley Center16,508
| 6–6
|-style="background:#bbffbb;"
| 13 || November 25, 1996 || @ Orlando
| W 100–88
|
|
|
| Orlando Arena16,808
| 7–6
|-style="background:#bbffbb;"
| 14 || November 27, 1996 || Cleveland
| W 92–75
|
|
|
| Bradley Center14,189
| 8–6
|-style="background:#fcc;"
| 15 || November 30, 1996 || Charlotte
| L 87–94
|
|
|
| Bradley Center16,327
| 8–7

|-style="background:#fcc;"
| 16 || December 3, 1996 || Chicago
| L 104–107
|
|
|
| Bradley Center18,717
| 8–8
|-style="background:#bbffbb;"
| 17 || December 7, 1996 || @ Washington
| W 126–118
|Glenn Robinson (44)
|Vin Baker (13)
|
| US Airways Arena18,756
| 9–8
|-style="background:#bbffbb;"
| 18 || December 8, 1996 || Boston
| W 100–87
|
|
|
| Bradley Center13,350
| 10–8
|-style="background:#fcc;"
| 19 || December 10, 1996 || Detroit
| L 85–93
|
|
|
| Bradley Center13,202
| 10–9
|-style="background:#bbffbb;"
| 20 || December 12, 1996 || Seattle
| W 100–97
|Glenn Robinson (32)
|
|
| Bradley Center16,355
| 11–9
|-style="background:#bbffbb;"
| 21 || December 14, 1996 || New Jersey
| W 101–91
|Vin Baker, Glenn Robinson (27)
|
|
| Bradley Center16,689
| 12–9
|-style="background:#bbffbb;"
| 22 || December 16, 1996 || @ Boston
| W 107–91
|
|
|
| Fleet Center15,030
| 13–9
|-style="background:#fcc;"
| 23 || December 18, 1996 || L. A. Lakers
| W 107–91
|
|
|
| Bradley Center16,829
| 13–10

Player statistics

Awards and records
 Vin Baker, All-NBA Third Team
 Ray Allen, NBA All-Rookie Team 2nd Team

Transactions

Trades

Free agents

Player Transactions Citation:

References

See also
 1996-97 NBA season

Milwaukee Bucks seasons
Milwaukee Bucks
Milwaukee Bucks
Milwaukee